Family estrangement is the loss of a previously existing relationship between family members, through physical and/or emotional distancing, often to the extent that there is negligible or no communication between the individuals involved for a prolonged period.

Estrangement may result from the direct interactions between those affected, including traumatic experiences of domestic violence, abuse, neglect, parental misbehavior such as repetitive explosive outbursts or intense marital conflict and disagreements, attachment disorders, differing values and beliefs, disappointment, major life events or change, or poor communication.  It may also result from the involvement or interference of a third party.

The estrangement is often unwanted, or considered unsatisfactory, by at least one party involved.

Overview 

Family estrangements are broken relationships between parents, grandparents, siblings, children, cousins, etc. Although a family estrangement can begin at any stage of life, it often begins during late adolescence or early adulthood. Characteristics of estrangement may include a lack of empathy in one or more of the parties involved. This can result in heightened levels of stress in all parties, although in the case of an abusive relationship the victim may feel a sense of relief once the source of stress has been removed.

A significant proportion of estrangements involve a third party, such as a member of the extended family or the adult child's spouse. In some cases, the third party provides emotional support to the individual initiating the estrangement, providing the estranger with an alternate social support system and thus enabling the deepening of the estrangement. In other instances, the third party – either deliberately or not consciously – is actually the sole or primary cause of two family members becoming estranged.

The rejected individual, or estrangee, may or may not try a number of strategies to repair the rift. In some cases, taking responsibility and making amends for harsh words or difficult circumstances may improve the relationship. However, if the estrangement is the result of a behavioural pattern (such as a personality disorder) rather than a sequence of unfortunate life events, it is doubtful that the relationship will survive in any meaningful form.

In some cases, the initiator of the estrangement stipulates boundaries in order to maintain limited contact (and therefore limit emotional damage) with the person they see as a potential abuser. In other cases, the initiator is unable or unwilling to consider any type of reconciliation.

Health implications 

Although the rejected party's psychological and physical health may decline, the estrangement initiator's may improve due to the cessation of abuse and conflict. The social rejection in family estrangement is the equivalent of ostracism which undermines four fundamental human needs: the need to belong, the need for control in social situations, the need to maintain high levels of self-esteem, and the need to have a sense of meaningful existence. The rejected parties suffer adverse psychological consequences such as loneliness, low self-esteem, aggression, and depression.

Family estrangement activates the grief response, this is because people who have experienced this often see it as a loss they were not prepared for and happened unexpectedly. However, the rejected family may not achieve the final grief stage of acceptance, given that the social death of the relationship is potentially reversible. The prolonged suffering of the rejected party, together with a perceived or real stigma of having been rejected by a family member, results in isolation and behavioral changes in the rejected party.

Social workers who work with the elderly population are at the forefront of a new fallout from the family estrangement. Non-supportive or absent family members during someone's end-of-life acutely increase the pain and stress of the final days.

Culture 

The separation of young adults from their families of origin in order to create families of their own is part of normal human development. According to Bowen theory, this separation can be achieved in a healthy and gradual manner that preserves the intergenerational relationships of the family of origin, providing both the new family and family of origin with a sense of continuity and support. Alternately, a schism can differentiate these life stages. Familial estrangement falls into the second category.

The emphasis on the individual over a collective family unit is regarded as contributing to estrangement, as well as a rationale for estrangement. In individualistic cultures, the estranger typically justifies the estrangement in relation to emotional, physical or sexual abuse.  Other estrangers may see a lack of emotional support or clash of values as the justification, or may blame the other person for their own unhappiness. Estrangers who have suffered abuse often receive emotional support/validation as it can be easier for them to articulate and get others to understand their experience. For some victims of psychological or emotional abuse the damage has been done over a long period of time by a characteristic pattern of subtle deniable abuse. For these people, validation may never appear in any meaningful form unless it is professional help. The estranged may also become less socially accepted because of lowered self-regulation, a reaction to the social rejection.

Contributing causes 
Although working through stressful issues with communication, consideration and compassion can be a healthy coping mechanism, the effort can be demanding.

Value or identity conflict 
A family member's sexual orientation, choice of spouse, gender identity, disability, religion or lack thereof may cause the estranged party to feel judged, unloved, or unaccepted causing them to initiate the estrangement or may cause the parents to disown their child. Life choices regarding education, profession, and geography are other potentially emotionally charged topics that reflect social values. 

Working through feelings to reach an understanding that accommodates the individual within the family unit challenges each individual's sense of identity as part of a society. When one or more family members rank their expectations and emotions as more important than those of another family member, then the conversation becomes a zero-sum game. This is known as a social trap in social psychology, a situation where the long-term consequences of decisions result in a cumulative loss to all parties. In these instances, estrangement is more likely than accommodation.

Divorce 
Divorce was cited as a reason for estrangement by 12.3% of parents and 2.3% of children in one study.  Divorced families are significantly over-represented among people experiencing a parent–child estrangement.

Child abuse 
Child abuse in the form of emotional, psychological, sexual, or physical abuse was cited by 13.9% of children who initiated estrangement with one or both parents as a reason for estrangement. Furthermore, 2.9% of estranged parents acknowledged their failure to prevent the abuse.  Abuse by siblings is a factor in some estrangements between siblings.

Substance abuse
Substance and alcohol abuse, on the part of either the estranger or the estranged, are common causes of family tension and the resulting separation. The most highly predictive domain of social estrangement for both alcohol and drug dependency is homelessness.

Mental illness
Mental illness on the part of either the estranger or the estranged is also a common cause of family tension and estrangement.

Post traumatic stress disorder (PTSD) is correlated with family estrangement. Both the PTSD sufferer's symptoms and the family members' failure to be sufficiently supportive can contribute to the estrangement. Studies on soldiers with PTSD have concluded that families with a PTSD patient require more support to facilitate healing and prevent estrangement.

Personality disorders
Personality disorders, particularly the cluster B personality disorders (antisocial personality disorder, borderline personality disorder, histrionic personality disorder, and narcissistic personality disorder), cause significant interpersonal conflicts. Sufferers typically have volatile relationships and may be both the estranger and the estranged multiple times throughout their lives.

Betrayal of trust 
From disputes over inheritances to perceived insults in public settings, a sense of betrayal can weaken the trust bonds of a family. According to developmental psychologist Erik Erikson, trust is the foundation of any relationship.

Explanations 
There are underlying psychological factors that explain family estrangement beyond the surface rationale of the scenario.

Bowen theory 
In Bowen family systems theory, emotional cutoff and avoidance are unhealthy coping mechanisms for dealing with anxiety and stress. These coping mechanisms represent emotional and intellectual systems that are fused rather than differentiated, so that emotions overwhelm objective thought process and govern behavior. Poor differentiation is associated with continued relationship problems in life. Poor differentiation is also contagious in that it may induce stress in others. High differentiation is associated with emotional interdependence and multi-generational cooperation. Triangulation is when a third party enters the dynamic. A third party, however, may increase tension and trigger a rebellion.

Victim – persecutor – rescuer 

The Karpman drama triangle is a model of dysfunctional social behaviors. The persecutor attempts to shift blame or responsibility for their own actions onto another, the rescuer offers help to the victim in a manner that reinforces dependence, and the victim feels victimized, powerless and ashamed.

Personal growth 
Only since the late 20th century, family estrangement has been framed, usually by the estrangers rather than the involuntarily estranged family members, as a sign of their own personal growth.  This marks a recent shift from families as a source of moral obligations and material support to people seeing their families as tools to increase their individual happiness and to affirm their identities.  People in this mindset may say that their choice is "courageous rather than avoidant or selfish".

Costs and benefits 
In the case of a parent–child estrangement, in which the adult child is typically the estranger, the adult child may receive benefits such as a sense of gaining power within the relationship, of freedom, or of control.  The rejected parents do not experience any benefits but do experience social stigma and feelings of loss.

Reconciliation 
Reconciliation and resolution of the conflict are possible in some situations.  A decision to "live life forward", and to not seek the emotional validation of getting the other parties to agree about what happened in the past, helps some people build a functional, if sometimes more limited, relationship.  This may involve setting boundaries collaboratively, for example, so that all parties agree that a particularly difficult subject will not be discussed.  For example, parents and their adult children may set boundaries together about how often they want to communicate or what information should be considered private.

Triggers for reconciliation include changes in the family situation due to death or divorce, worries about health and death, and developing a clearer perspective about the original situation through the passage of time.

Substitute families 

Both the estranger and the estranged may use social and work relationships to create substitute families.  Support groups and other highly emotional organizations also provide a conduit for emotional energy from unresolved issues with parents, siblings and other family members. Becoming passionate about a cause or hobby is another coping mechanism, termed sublimation in psychiatry.

See also 
Dassler brothers feud
Absenteeism
Attachment theory
Disownment
Emotional detachment
Parental alienation
Psychological punishment
Shunning
Social rejection
Defence mechanisms

References

Further reading

External links 
 Young Adult Development Project
  The Bowen Center
 Stand Alone Charity
 Together Estranged 501(c)(3) Nonprofit Organization

Family
Shunning